Zealandites is an extinct genus of ammonite cephalopod that lived during the Cretaceous.  Various fossils are found in Cretaceous marine strata in North America, New Zealand, East Asia, and Antarctica

References 

Ammonites of North America
Cretaceous ammonites